Gilpin Township is a Second class Township in Armstrong County, Pennsylvania, United States. At the 2010 census it had a population of 2,496. As of the 2020 census, its population had decreased to 2,411, a 3.4% decrease.

History
Settled in 1814, the area was originally organized as the larger Allegheny Township. In 1878, finding it was too large to manage and supervise, this township was split into three, and Bethel, Gilpin and Parks Townships were incorporated.  Gilpin Township is home to many small villages and communities such as Schenley, Aladdin, Forks Church, Johnetta, Godfrey Landing, Georgetown, Bagdad, and Banfield, each of which have a large history of their own.

The earliest industries of the township were the sawmills of Michael Barrickman and Philip Klingensmith, the former on Elder's run and the latter on the same run, but higher up. The first was built in 1812 and the last in 1817. In 1914, Gilpin Township was, so far as manufacturing was concerned, possibly ahead of any other in the country, it being right at the junction of the Kiskiminetas and Allegheny rivers, so giving drainage to manufacturing sites which can scarcely be excelled by any township in the several counties adjoining.

Johnetta

The town of Johnetta, established in 1892 and dissolved in 1930, is located in the Allegheny valley, the houses being built on a high bluff overlooking the river. Each house was surrounded by a large plot of ground suitable for gardening, and fruit and shade trees were planted along the streets. The town depended entirely upon the operations of the Pittsburgh-Buffalo Company, controlled by the Jones interests. John H. Jones, president of the company, residing there all the year round. The town was supplied with water and sewerage facilities. The amusement hall in the town contained standard bowling alleys, billiard and pool tables, a refreshment stand, and a large roller skating rink, which was also used for a meeting place. The town consisted of 140 frame houses, sixteen brick residences, a store, schoolhouse, and the Johnetta Memorial Church, presided over by Rev. Walter Kennedy. The houses were heated by gas taken from the company's own wells. The population was 662, of which about 500 are employees of the company. The Johnetta Plant of the United States Sewer Pipe Company utilized the Kittanning clay for the manufacture of refractory products. This clay immediately underlaid the Kittanning coal, which was mined in advance of the clay, and which found a ready market at the northern lake ports. The clay seam was about 15 feet in thickness, of exceptional purity, and adapted to the manufacture of pavers, high-grade face brick and sewer pipe.

Bagdad

Four miles above Schenley, on the Kiskiminetas river, and two miles below Leechburg is the old village of Bagdad. It was at this old town, or a short distance below it, that a point on the Pennsylvania canal known for years as "Wherry's Defeat" was located. The following incident or disaster gave rise to this name. When building this section of the canal the late James Wherry, of South Bend township, this county, had the contract, and it was found necessary to build an extensive riprap or retaining wall sloping from the edge of the towpath to the river. Just when it was nearing completion the Old "Kiski" got on one of her "tears" and swept away the work of months and with it several thousand dollars of the contractors' hard earned and not too plentiful money. The wall was rebuilt. Bagdad became prominent as a salt-producing company, and some of the best wells along this river, famous then for this industry, were drilled at this place and above and below it, most of the salt boilers and miners lived in the little village.

Schenley and Aladdin

In 1888 the Schenley Distilling Company was established at the junction of the Allegheny and the Kiskiminetas rivers, in Gilpin township and the village has been called after the company ever since. They had five warehouses, with a capacity of 10,000 barrels per year, and employed thirty men, who, with their families, composed the population of the village of Schenley – about 150 souls. The capitalization of the company was $400,000. The place also had two stores and a school. One of the large warehouses was burned in July, 1912, entailing a loss of $350,000, over one hundred barrels of whiskey being burned.

In 1894 a coal works was started at Aladdin to work the Freeport vein of coal, which could be mined by "drifting," as it was termed. A company composed of miners undertook to run this, but were unable to finance it, and in 1898 the works were purchased by Joseph G. Beale, of Leechburg, who was already in the coal business at that place. He operated the works, the opening being on the Buffalo & Allegheny division of the Pennsylvania Railroad, formerly known in Armstrong county history as the Allegheny Valley Railroad. This company was chartered as the Aladdin Coal Company. In 1890 a Greek named William Porterie came to Schenley, having in some way heard of the pitch or waste from the cannel coal oil and for several years made a considerable sum distilling and melting the residue, which he dug up on the grounds of the old North American Oil Works. In the meantime, he built quite a large candy factory at Aladdin station, and having acquired some lands from the Schenley estate, owned by Mary Schenley of England, who was still living at that time, he drilled for gas and was rewarded by striking a good flow. He put down other wells and for several years furnished the Enterprise Gas Company of Freeport, and also the Leechburg Gaslight and Fuel Company of Leechburg, with gas, so that this little point right at the junction of the Allegheny and Kiskiminetas had been one of the most important for its area of any place in the county.

Geography
Pennsylvania Route 66 is the main highway that runs through the township, with Leechburg Borough, Parks Township, and Bethel Township at each entrance. Gilpin is bordered on the west by the Allegheny River and to the south by the Kiskiminetas River. The community of Schenley is located within Gilpin Township at the confluence of the two rivers. Murphy Island is within the township in the Allegheny River.

Demographics

As of the census of 2000, there were 2,587 people, 1,034 households, and 768 families residing in the township.  The population density was 157.0 people per square mile (60.6/km).  There were 1,114 housing units at an average density of 67.6/sq mi (26.1/km).  The racial makeup of the township was 97.99% White, 1.01% African American, 0.04% Native American, 0.19% Asian, 0.12% Pacific Islander, 0.04% from other races, and 0.62% from two or more races. Hispanic or Latino of any race were 0.19% of the population.

There were 1,034 households, out of which 26.6% had children under the age of 18 living with them, 63.6% were married couples living together, 6.8% had a female householder with no husband present, and 25.7% were non-families. 23.0% of all households were made up of individuals, and 13.3% had someone living alone who was 65 years of age or older.  The average household size was 2.49 and the average family size was 2.91.

The township median age of 43 years was significantly more than the county median age of 40 years. The distribution by age group was 20.4% under the age of 18, 6.5% from 18 to 24, 26.8% from 25 to 44, 25.4% from 45 to 64, and 20.9% who were 65 years of age or older.  The median age was 43 years. For every 100 females, there were 101.2 males.  For every 100 females age 18 and over, there were 98.1 males.

The median income for a household in the township was $38,958, and the median income for a family was $47,652. Males had a median income of $37,500 versus $22,011 for females. The per capita income for the township was $17,520.  About 6.0% of families and 7.0% of the population were below the poverty line, including 4.1% of those under age 18 and 11.2% of those age 65 or over.

Churches 
- Forks- Zion Evangelical Lutheran Church

- Christ the King Church

Cemeteries
Evergreen Cemetery
Forks - Zion Lutheran Evangelical Church Cemetery
Saint Catherine Cemetery

References

Populated places established in 1814
Pittsburgh metropolitan area
Townships in Armstrong County, Pennsylvania
Townships in Pennsylvania